Furanochromone is a chemical compound which is a derivative of chromone (1,4-benzopyrone) and furan.

Some chemical derivatives of furanochromone show strong interaction with DNA. Furanochromones can be produced in callus cultures of Ammi visnaga or in Pimpinella monoica.

References